Karpin may refer to:

 Andra Karpin (born 1979), an Estonian footballer 
 Michael Karpin (born 1945), an Israeli broadcast journalist and author
 Valery Karpin, a Russian footballer.

Karpin may also refer to the following places:
Karpin, Łódź Voivodeship (central Poland)
Karpin, Masovian Voivodeship (east-central Poland)
Karpin, Choszczno County in West Pomeranian Voivodeship (north-west Poland)
Karpin, Police County in West Pomeranian Voivodeship (north-west Poland)